Kozulsky District is an administrative and municipal district (raion), one of the forty-three in Krasnoyarsk Krai, Russia. It is located in the southwest of the krai and borders with Birilyussky District in the north, Yemelyanovsky District in the east, Balakhtinsky District in the south, and with Nazarovsky, Achinsky and Bolsheuluysky Districts in the west. Its administrative center is the urban locality (an urban-type settlement) of Kozulka. Population:  19,010 (2002 Census);  The population of Kozulka accounts for 47.9% of the district's total population.

Government
As of 2013, the Head of District and the Chairman of the District Council is Igor V. Krivenkov.

Economy

Transportation
The Trans-Siberian Railway runs through the district from west to east. A part of the federal highway M53 passes through the district as well.

References

Notes

Sources

Districts of Krasnoyarsk Krai
States and territories established in 1924